Isaac Kuoki (born May 6, 1978, in Accra) is a Ghanaian football attacking midfielder.

Career 
Kuoki began his career by Al-Najma before scouted from Asante Kotoko, before in 2004 leaving the club with a move to PFC Beroe Stara Zagora. After 3 years he left Beroe.

 1993-1999 Asante Kotoko
 1999-2003 Al-Najma
 2001-2004 Asante Kotoko
 2004-2007 Beroe

Position 
Kuoki is an attacking midfielder for his club.

Personal 
Height - 1.76 m. Weight - 67 kg.

References

External links 
Player Profile
Isaac Kwakye Profile

1978 births
Living people
Ghanaian footballers
Ghanaian expatriate footballers
Association football midfielders
Footballers from Accra
Al-Najma SC players
Asante Kotoko S.C. players
PFC Beroe Stara Zagora players
Saudi Professional League players
Ghana Premier League players
First Professional Football League (Bulgaria) players
Expatriate footballers in Saudi Arabia
Expatriate footballers in Bulgaria
Ghanaian expatriate sportspeople in Saudi Arabia
Ghanaian expatriate sportspeople in Bulgaria

bg:Айзък Куоки
nl:Isaak Kuoke